Mysidae is the largest family of crustaceans in the order Mysida, with over 1000 species in around 170 genera.

Characteristics
Members of the family Mysidae are distinguished from other mysids by the fact that the first pereopod (walking leg) has a well-developed exopod (outer branch), the carpopropodus of the endopod (inner branch) of the 3rd to 8th pereopods is divided into sub-segments and there are statocysts on the endopod of the uropods (posterior appendages). Female petalophthalmidans have two or three oostegites (flexible bristly flaps) forming the base of the marsupium or brood pouch under the thorax, apart from the subfamily Boreomysinae, which has seven pairs of oostegites.

Subfamilies and genera
The following subfamilies and genera are recognised:

Boreomysinae Holt & Tattersall, 1905
Neobirsteiniamysis Hendrickx et Tchindonova, 2020
Boreomysis G. O. Sars, 1869
Erythropinae Hansen, 1910
Aberomysis Bacescu & Iliffe, 1986
Amathimysis Brattegard, 1969
Amblyops G. O. Sars, 1872
Amblyopsoides O. S. Tattersall, 1955
Arachnomysis Chun, 1887
Atlanterythrops Nouvel & Lagardère, 1976
Australerythrops W. Tattersall, 1928
Caesaromysis Ortmann, 1893
Chunomysis Holt & Tattersall, 1905
Dactylamblyops Holt & Tattersall, 1906
Dactylerythrops Holt & Tattersall, 1905
Echinomysides Murano, 1977
Echinomysis Illig, 1905
Erythrops G. O. Sars, 1869
Euchaetomera G. O. Sars, 1883
Euchaetomeropsis W. Tattersall, 1909
Gibbamblyops Murano & Krygier, 1985
Gibberythrops Illig, 1930
Gymnerythrops Hansen, 1910
Heteroerythrops O. Tattersall, 1955
Holmesiella Ortmann, 1908
Hyperamblyops Birstein & Tchindonova, 1958
Hypererythrops Holt & Tattersall, 1905
Illigiella Murano, 1981
Indoerythrops Panampunnayil, 1998
Katerythrops Holt & Tattersall, 1905
Liuimysis Wang, 1998
Longithorax Illig, 1906
Marumomysis Murano, 1999
Meierythrops Murano, 1981
Metamblyops W. Tattersall, 1907
Meterythrops S. I. Smith, 1879
Michthyops Tattersall, 1911
Mysimenzies Bacescu, 1971
Nakazawaia Murano, 1981
Neoamblyops Fukuoka, 2009
Nipponerythrops Murano, 1977
Paramblyops Holt & Tattersall, 1905
Parapseudomma Nouvel & Lagardère, 1976
Parerythrops G. O. Sars, 1869
Pleurerythrops Ii, 1964
Pseudamblyops Ii, 1964
Pseuderythrops Coifmann, 1936
Pseudomma G. O. Sars, 1870
Pteromysis Ii, 1964
Scolamblyops Murano, 1974
Shenimysis Wang, 1998
Synerythrops Hansen, 1910
Teratamblyops Murano, 2001
Teraterythrops Ii, 1964
Thalassomysis W. Tattersall, 1939
Xenerythrops Ii, 1964
Gastrosaccinae Norman, 1892
Anchialina Norman & Scott, 1906
Archaeomysis Czerniavsky, 1882
Chlamydopleon Ortmann, 1893
Coifmanniella Heard & Price, 2006
Eurobowmaniella Murano, 1995
Gastrosaccus Norman, 1868
Haplostylus Kossmann, 1880
Iiella Bacescu, 1968
Paranchialina Hansen, 1910
Pseudanchialina Hansen, 1910
Heteromysinae Norman, 1892
Bermudamysis Bacescu & Iliffe, 1986
Burrimysis Jaume & Garcia, 1993
Deltamysis Bowman & Orsi, 1992
Heteromysis S. I. Smith, 1873
Heteromysoides Bacescu, 1968
Ischiomysis Wittmann, 2013
Mysidetes Holt & Tattersall, 1906
Mysifaun Wittmann, 1996
Platymysis Brattegard, 1980
Platyops Bacescu & Iliffe, 1986
Pseudomysidetes W. Tattersall, 1936
Retromysis Wittmann, 2004
Leptomysinae Hansen, 1910
Afromysis Zimmer, 1916
Americamysis Price, Heard & Stuck, 1994
Antichthomysis Fenton, 1991
Australomysis W. Tattersall, 1927
Bathymysis W. Tattersall, 1907
Brasilomysis Bacescu, 1968
Calyptomma W. Tattersall, 1909
Ceratodoxomysis Murano, 2003
Cubanomysis Bacescu, 1968
Dioptromysis Zimmer, 1915
Doxomysis Hansen, 1912
Harmelinella Ledoyer, 1989
Hyperiimysis Nouvel, 1966
Iimysis Nouvel, 1966
Leptomysis G. O. Sars, 1869
Megalopsis Panampunnayil, 1987
Metamysidopsis W. Tattersall, 1951
Mysideis G. O. Sars, 1869
Mysidopsis G. O. Sars, 1864
Neobathymysis Bravo & Murano, 1996
Neodoxomysis Murano, 1999
Notomysis Wittmann, 1986
Nouvelia Bacescu & Vasilescu, 1973
Paraleptomysis Liu & Wang, 1983
Prionomysis W. Tattersall, 1922
Proleptomysis Wittmann, 1985
Promysis Dana, 1850
Pseudomysis G. O. Sars, 1879
Pseudoxomysis Nouvel, 1973
Pyroleptomysis Wittmann, 1985
Rostromysis Panampunnayil, 1987
Tenagomysis Thomson, 1900
Mancomysinae Bacescu & Iliffe, 1986
Palaumysis Bacescu & Iliffe, 1986
Mysidellinae Czerniavsky, 1882
Mysidella G. O. Sars, 1872
Mysinae Haworth, 1825
Acanthomysis Czerniavsky, 1882
Alienacanthomysis Holmquist, 1981
Anisomysis Hansen, 1910
Antarctomysis Coutière, 1906
Antromysis Creaser, 1936
Arthromysis Colosi, 1924
Boreoacanthomysis Fukuoka & Murano, 2004
Carnegieomysis W. Tattersall, 1943
Caspiomysis G. O. Sars, 1907
Columbiaemysis Holmquist, 1982
Diamysis Czerniavsky, 1882
Disacanthomysis Holmquist, 1981
Exacanthomysis Holmquist, 1981
Gangemysis Derzhavin, 1924
Gironomysis Ortiz, García-Debrás & Pérez, 1997
Halemysis Bacescu & Udrescu, 1984
Hemiacanthomysis Fukuoka & Murano, 2002
Hemimysis G. O. Sars, 1869
Hippacanthomysis Murano & Chess, 1987
Holmesimysis Holmquist, 1979
Hyperacanthomysis Fukuoka & Murano, 2000
Hyperstilomysis Fukuoka, Bravo & Murano, 2005
Idiomysis W. Tattersall, 1922
Indomysis W. Tattersall, 1914
Inusitatomysis Ii, 1940
Javanisomysis Bacescu, 1992
Kainommatomysis W. Tattersall, 1927
Katamysis G. O. Sars, 1893
Keslerella Czerniavsky, 1882
Limnomysis Czerniavsky, 1882
Lycomysis Hansen, 1910
Macromysis White, 1847
Mesacanthomysis Nouvel, 1967
Mesopodopsis Czerniavsky, 1882
Mysidium Dana, 1852
Mysis Latreille, 1802
Nanomysis W. Tattersall, 1921
Neomysis Czerniavsky, 1882
Nipponomysis Takahashi & Murano, 1986
Notacanthomysis Fukuoka & Murano, 2000
Orientomysis Derzhavin, 1913
Pacifacanthomysis Holmquist, 1981
Paracanthomysis Ii, 1936
Paramesopodopsis Fenton, 1985
Paramysis Czerniavsky, 1882
Parapodopsis Czerniavsky, 1882
Parastilomysis Ii, 1936
Parvimysis Brattegard, 1969
Praunus Leach, 1814
Proneomysis W. Tattersall, 1933
Sarmysis Maissuradze & Popescu, 1987
Schistomysis Norman, 1892
Stilomysis Norman, 1894
Surinamysis Bowman, 1977
Taphromysis Banner, 1953
Tasmanomysis Fenton, 1985
Telacanthomysis Fukuoka & Murano, 2001
Troglomysis Stammer, 1933
Xenacanthomysis Holmquist, 1980
Rhopalophthalminae Hansen, 1910
Rhopalophthalmus Illig, 1906
Siriellinae Norman, 1892
Hemisiriella Hansen, 1910
Metasiriella Murano, 1986
Siriella Dana, 1850

See also

Heteromysis actiniae

References

External links

Mysida
Crustacean families